Jean-François Daniel (born 14 June 1964) is a retired French footballer who played as a midfielder.

Honours

 1985–86 French Division 2 (Group A)

External links
 
 

1964 births
Living people
French footballers
Association football midfielders
AS Saint-Étienne players
Lille OSC players
AS Cannes players
FC Girondins de Bordeaux players
OGC Nice players